KMDR (95.1 FM) is a radio station airing an adult contemporary format licensed to McKinleyville, California.  The station is owned by Mad River Radio, Inc.

References

External links
KMDR's official website

Mainstream adult contemporary radio stations in the United States
MDR